Tucker Stephenson (born October 23, 1996) is an American soccer player who currently plays for Oklahoma City Energy in the USL Championship.

Career

Youth and college 
Stephenson began playing college soccer at the University of West Virginia in 2015, where he played for two seasons before transferring to Loyola University Chicago in 2017. 

While at college, Stephenson appeared for USL Premier Development League sides Des Moines Menace and Kaw Valley FC.

Professional 
On July 23, 2019, Stephenson joined USL Championship side Swope Park Rangers. He left the club at the end of the season without making a first team appearance.

On January 14, 2020, Stephenson signed with USL Championship side Oklahoma City Energy.

References

External links 
 Tucker Stephenson - Men's Soccer West Virginia bio
 Tucker Stephenson - Men's Soccer Loyola bio

1996 births
Living people
American soccer players
Association football forwards
West Virginia Mountaineers men's soccer players
Loyola Ramblers men's soccer players
Des Moines Menace players
Sporting Kansas City II players
OKC Energy FC players
Soccer players from Kansas
USL Championship players
USL League Two players